Robert Borsak (born 14 August 1953) is the leader of the Shooters, Fishers and Farmers Party (SFF). He represents the party in the New South Wales Legislative Council.  He was chosen by the Shooters and Fishers Party to fill the New South Wales Legislative Council vacancy caused by the death of Roy Smith on 30 July 2010.

During his time in NSW Parliament, Borsak has advocated for more funding and services for rural and regional NSW, defended the rights of law-abiding firearm users, introduced a bill to criminalise attacks on farms by animal rights activists, lobbied for further support of the greyhound racing industry and railed against attempts to restrict recreational fishing. Borsak has also called on the NSW Government to re-negotiate the Murray Darling Basin Plan, to secure a better deal for NSW farmers and regional communities. Borsak also has denied human involvement in climate change, stating that "scientific research, reports and arguments supporting human blame for climate change, were wrong".

Prior to be being elected to parliament, Borsak acted as Chairman of the Game Council NSW, which sets standards for conservation hunting in Australia.

He is an active hunter and fisher.

Political career 
Borsak is a member of a number of Legislative Council committees, which scrutinise government activity. He chaired an inquiry into the NSW Government decision to re-locate Sydney's Powerhouse Museum. He has been publicly critical of both the cost of the museum move and the NSW Government's failure to release a business case.

Under Borsak, SFF campaigned on a "biased for the bush" agenda during the 2019 state election campaign, pledging to divert funds and services away from Sydney and towards regional NSW. The party achieved its best ever result at the election, winning three lower house seats. Controversially, despite routine denial of preference deals between SFFP and the Labor Party,  Borsak was captured on film encouraging the taxi council to start a grassroots campaign to direct voters to Labor in the run-up to the February 2023 by-election

In 2022, Borsak was criticised for comments that he made suggesting that independent MP Helen Dalton, who had recently left the SFF, "should be clocked." Following Borsak's refusal to apologise for these comments, MPs Roy Butler and Philip Donato later resigned from the party, after failing to remove Borsak as leader.

References

1953 births
Living people
Members of the New South Wales Legislative Council
Shooters, Fishers and Farmers Party politicians
Australian accountants
Australian fishers
Australian hunters
University of Technology Sydney alumni
Australian people of Polish descent
21st-century Australian politicians